Daisho Con was an annual three-day  multi-genre convention held during November at the Kalahari Resorts: Wisconsin Dells in Wisconsin Dells, Wisconsin. The convention's name came from a small sword used by the samurai, named 'daisho'.

Programming
The convention typically offered an artists’ alley, board games, card games, a cosplay contest, dealers’ room, live music, rave, and video game room. The video game room ran 24-hours a day during the convention.

History
Daisho Con was founded by three students of the University of Wisconsin–Stevens Point and organized by a group of the same name. In February 2010, the convention held a live fundraiser broadcast over Ustream to raise money to aid relief efforts following the 2010 Haiti earthquake. The Ramada Inn, Daisho Con's 2010 location, would suddenly close in October 2011. In 2015, the convention was scheduled against Awesome Con Milwaukee, until they cancelled. Daisho Con 2020 was cancelled due to the COVID-19 pandemic. Daisho Con announced the convention would not return in November 2021.

Event history

References

External links

Defunct multigenre conventions
Recurring events established in 2008
2008 establishments in Wisconsin
Annual events in Wisconsin
Festivals in Wisconsin
Organizations based in Wisconsin
Tourist attractions in Sauk County, Wisconsin
Wisconsin Dells, Wisconsin
Conventions in Wisconsin
Recurring events disestablished in 2021